1263 Varsavia, provisional designation , is an asteroid from the central region of the asteroid belt, approximately 40 kilometers in diameter. It was discovered on 23 March 1933, by Belgian astronomer Sylvain Arend at Uccle Observatory in Belgium. It is named for the city of Warsaw.

Orbit and classification 
Varsavia orbits the Sun in the central main-belt at a distance of 2.2–3.2 AU once every 4 years and 4 months (1,589 days). Its orbit has an eccentricity of 0.19 and an inclination of 29° with respect to the ecliptic. As no precoveries were taken, and no prior identifications were made, the body's observation arc begins with its official discovery observation at Uccle in 1933.

Physical characteristics 
Varsavia is an X-type asteroid in the Tholen taxonomy. In the SMASS classification, it is a Xc-type, that transitions to the carbonaceous C-type asteroids.

Rotation period 
In April 2003, the first rotational lightcurve of Varsavia was obtained by American astronomer Brian Warner at his Palmer Divide Station in Colorado. Revised data gave a well-defined rotation period of 7.1639 hours with a brightness variation of 0.15 magnitude (U=3).

Another well defined period of 7.1680 hours (Δ0.15 mag) was derived from photometric observations taken by Australian astronomer Julian Oey at Leura Observatory in February 2011 (U=3). Concurring results were also obtained by Robert Stephens in April 2003 (7.231 h; Δ0.15 mag), from the Palomar Transient Factory in June 2012 (7.1659 h; Δ0.28 mag), and by the "Spanish Photometric Asteroid Analysis Group" (OBAS) in May 2016 (7.163 h; Δ0.12 mag; U=3-). Observations made with the TESS space telescope in 2018 gave a period of 7.1615 hours with an amplitude of 0.05 magnitude (U=2).

Diameter and albedo 
According to the surveys carried out by the Infrared Astronomical Satellite IRAS, the Japanese Akari satellite, and NASA's Wide-field Infrared Survey Explorer with its subsequent NEOWISE mission, Varsavia measures between 34.15 and 51.44 kilometers in diameter, and its surface has an albedo between 0.042 and 0.10. The Collaborative Asteroid Lightcurve Link derives an albedo of 0.0874 and adopts a diameter of 41 kilometers, obtained from modeled data and a directly observed minor planet occultation of a star.

On July 18, 2003, a stellar occultation by 1263 Varsavia was observed at multiple sites. The profile best matched a spin vector of (λp, βp) = (341°, −14°) in elliptical coordinates.

Naming 
This minor planet was named by Tadeusz Banachiewicz after the Latin name of the city of Warsaw, capital of Poland. The naming citation includes a note of thanks for the support given by the city's observatory. Naming citation was first published in German by Astronomisches Rechen-Institut.

Notes

References

External links 
 Asteroid Lightcurve Database (LCDB), query form (info )
 Dictionary of Minor Planet Names, Google books
 Asteroids and comets rotation curves, CdR – Observatoire de Genève, Raoul Behrend
 Discovery Circumstances: Numbered Minor Planets (1)-(5000) – Minor Planet Center
 
 

 

001263
Discoveries by Sylvain Arend
Named minor planets
001263
001263
19330323